This is a list of defunct airlines of Afghanistan.

See also

 List of airlines of Afghanistan
 List of airports in Afghanistan

References

Afghanistan
Airlines
Airlines, defunct